Father's Little Dividend is a 1951 American comedy film directed by Vincente Minnelli and starring Spencer Tracy, Joan Bennett, and Elizabeth Taylor. The movie is the sequel to Father of the Bride (1950).

Plot

In this sequel to Father of the Bride, newly married Kay Dunstan (Elizabeth Taylor) announces that she and her husband are going to have a baby, leaving her father, Stanley Banks (Spencer Tracy), having to come to grips with becoming a grandfather.

Middle-class family man Stanley Banks reminisces on events of the past year: One afternoon, returning from the office feeling happy and energetic, Stanley's routine is interrupted when his wife Ellie (Joan Bennett) tells him that they are having dinner with their daughter Kay and her husband, Buckley Dunstan (Don Taylor), to hear some important news. Although Stanley is certain that it concerns Buckley's business, the newlyweds reveal that Kay is expecting a baby. Buckley's parents, Doris (Billie Burke) and Herbert (Moroni Olsen), are delighted, as is Ellie, but Stanley broods that he is too young and vibrant to be a grandfather. Soon Ellie, flush with excitement, throws Kay a baby shower, something Stanley thinks is highway robbery not punishable by law. Later, Ellie suggests that they remodel their house to enable Kay, Buckley, and the baby to move in with them, but Stanley puts his foot down. Ellie is near tears when the wealthy Dunstans announce that they are planning to add a wing to their home for the couple, but is overjoyed when Kay and Buckley reveal that they have just bought their own little house, enabling Ellie to have free rein helping Kay decorate.

After settling into their new home, Kay, who is very close to her father, expresses her concern that the baby will make a difference in her relationship with Buckley. Stanley comforts her by telling her how much he loved her as a baby. Soon the Bankses and the Dunstans are trying to outdo one another buying gifts and making plans for the baby, up to his enrollment in college. One night, while listening to Ellie, Doris, and Herbert bicker over what the baby should be named, Kay breaks down and runs to her room. Only Stanley, who Kay feels is the sole parent who understands her, is able to comfort her. The day after pledging to Kay that he will make certain that none of the in-laws will interfere again, Stanley drags Ellie to Kay's physician, Dr. Andrew Nordell, anxious over the "modern" ideas Nordell has about a more natural method of childbirth and infant care.

For the next month or so, things remain calm, until Stanley is awakened by a late night call from Buckley, who says that Kay has left him "for good." After sneaking over to Buckley and Kay's place, Stanley learns from a cab driver that Kay took a taxi to his house. The two men then return to the Banks house, where the couple make up after Kay's jealousy is revealed to be a misunderstanding stemming from Buckley's late nights working at the office. Kay, as well as Stanley, realize Buckley's devotion to his family.

As the baby's birth approaches, nerves among the parents and grandparents become frayed. The eventual birth of a baby boy delights everyone, except Stanley, a distant and wary observer of the as-yet-unnamed baby, who starts to cry whenever Stanley comes near him.

When the baby is six months old, Kay joins Buckley on a brief business trip and leaves the baby with her parents, hoping to give Stanley time to grow closer to his grandson. One afternoon, while Kay is still away, Stanley takes the baby for a walk in the park. When the baby finally falls asleep in his carriage, Stanley joins some friendly neighborhood boys in a game of soccer and loses track of time. After the game, when Stanley cannot find the carriage, he frantically retraces his steps back to the house. Seeing through the window that Kay has returned early, he panics and takes a taxi to the local police station. There a befuddled Stanley confesses to the grim-faced police sergeant that he has lost the baby. Fearing the wrath of the police squad, who found the sweet-natured baby and have fallen in love with him, Stanley secretly prays that his grandson will not start to scream when he picks him up. To Stanley's relief, the baby is delighted to see him, and from that moment on, the two are devoted to each other. Some time later, at the baby's christening, Stanley beams with pride as his grandson is finally named "Stanley Banks Dunstan."

Cast

Production

Father of The Bride was such a hit at the box office and with critics, MGM rushed a sequel, Father's Little Dividend into production the following year.  The film was remade in 1995 as Father of the Bride Part II, with Steve Martin and Diane Keaton again in Tracy and Bennett's roles.

Spencer Tracy and Joan Bennett had made films together at Fox two decades earlier, including Me and My Gal (1932), in which their characters marry, and She Wanted a Millionaire (1932).

According to film critic Leonard Maltin, this film was one of the first examples of a proper modern movie studio sequel.

Reception
The sequel was well received by both audiences and critics and was nearly as financially successful as the first film. According to MGM records, the film earned $3,122,000 in the U.S. and Canada and $1.5 million elsewhere, resulting in a profit of $2,025,000.

Copyright status
Originally released by Metro-Goldwyn-Mayer, the film entered the public domain in the United States in 1979 because MGM failed to renew the copyright registration. Despite the fact that Warner Bros. Entertainment (via ownership of Turner Entertainment) owns the distribution rights to the original, they have not yet released an authorized DVD release of the sequel, which is available on DVD through several other DVD distributors.

References

External links

 
 
 
 
 
 

Father of the Bride (franchise)
1951 films
1951 romantic comedy films
American black-and-white films
American romantic comedy films
American sequel films
1950s English-language films
Films about families
Films directed by Vincente Minnelli
Metro-Goldwyn-Mayer films
American pregnancy films
Articles containing video clips
1950s pregnancy films
1950s American films